Sedat Celasun (1915, Istanbul – 17 July 1998) was a Turkish general. He was General Commander of the Gendarmerie of Turkey from 1978 to 1983. He was one of the five leaders of the 1980 military coup, and after the coup he was a member of the Presidential Council.

References 

1915 births
1998 deaths
Turkish Army generals
General Commanders of the Gendarmerie of Turkey